

This is a list of the Indiana state historical markers in St. Joseph County.

This is intended to be a complete list of the official state historical markers placed in St. Joseph County, Indiana, United States by the Indiana Historical Bureau. The locations of the historical markers and their latitude and longitude coordinates are included below when available, along with their names, years of placement, and topics as recorded by the Historical Bureau.  There are 18 historical markers located in St. Joseph County.

Historical markers

See also
List of Indiana state historical markers
National Register of Historic Places listings in St. Joseph County, Indiana

References

External links
Indiana Historical Marker Program
Indiana Historical Bureau

St. Joseph County
Historical markers